Platyptilia chosokeiella is a moth of the family Pterophoridae. It is found in central Vietnam, Taiwan and Cambodia.

References

Moths described in 1922
chosokeiella